Nicephorus, Nikephoros, or Nikiforos is a Greek male name, meaning "Bringer of Victory", which was commonly used among the Byzantine Empire's aristocracy. It may refer to:

People

Rulers

 Nikephoros I Logothetes, Byzantine emperor 802–811
 Nikephoros II Phokas, Byzantine emperor 963–969
 Nikephoros III Botaneiates Botaniates, Byzantine emperor 1078–1081
 Nikephoros I Komnenos Doukas, Despot of Epirus 1267–1297
 Nikephoros II Orsini, ruler of Epirus 1335–1338 and 1356–1359

Ecclesiastical leaders
 Nikephoros I of Constantinople, Byzantine  writer and patriarch, 758–828, author of the Stichometry and other works
 Nicephorus of Antioch, Greek Orthodox Patriarch of Antioch, 1084–1090
 Patriarch Nicephorus of Alexandria, Orthodox Patriarch of Alexandria between 1639 and 1645
 Nikiforos of Didymoteicho, Metropolitan of Didymoteicho in 1988–2009

Others
 Nikephoros (Caesar) (c. 755 – after 812), half-brother of Leo IV, involved in several conspiracies
 Nikephoritzes or Nikephoros (died 1078), eunuch chief minister of Michael VII Doukas
 Nikephoros Bryennios (ethnarch), father of Nikephoros Bryennios the Elder
 Nikephoros Bryennios the Elder, Byzantine general who made an attempt on the throne of Michael VII Doukas in 1077–1078
 Nikephoros Bryennios the Younger, son of the preceding, Byzantine general, statesman and historian, 1062–1137
 Nikephoros Choumnos (c. 1250–1327), Byzantine chief minister and scholar
 Nikephoros Diogenes general and son to Byzantine emperor Romanos IV Diogenes
 Nicephorus Gregoras, Byzantine historian, c. 1295–1360
 Nikephoros Kallistos Xanthopoulos, Greek ecclesiastical historian, c. 1320
 Nikephoros Komnenos (c. 970 – after 1026/7), Byzantine commander and governor
 Nikephoros Melissenos (c. 1045–1104), Byzantine general, self-proclaimed emperor and Caesar
 Nikephoros Ouranos, Byzantine general, chief aide to the emperor Basil II, viceroy in the East from 999 to c. 1010
 Nikephoros Phokas the Elder, Byzantine general, grandfather of emperor Nikephoros II
 Nikephoros the Monk, 13th-century monk and spiritual writer
 Nikephoros Theotokis (1731–1800), Greek scholar who became an archbishop in Russia
 Nikephoros Xiphias, Byzantine general, also aide to the emperor Basil II
 Nikiforos Diamandouros (born 1942), Greek and EU ombudsman
 Nikiforos Lytras (1832–1904), Greek painter
 Nikiforos Vrettakos (1912–1991), Greek writer
 Nikiforos, Greek singer
 Nikephoros Pastilas, a Byzantine general of the Thracesian Theme

Other uses 
Athena Nikephoros, the Goddess Athena of Victory
Nikiforos, a municipal unit in Drama regional unit, Greece
Nikiforos Fokas, a municipal unit in Rethymno regional unit, Greece
MV Nikiforos, a cargo ship
Nikiforos–Toxotis, a regular military exercise by the Cypriot and Greek militaries
Nicephorus (fly), a genus of fly.

See also 
 Nikifor (given name)

Greek masculine given names